The equine arteritis virus leader transcription-regulating sequence hairpin (LTH) is as RNA element that is thought to be a key structural element in discontinuous subgenomic RNA synthesis and is critical for leader transcription-regulating sequences (TRS) function. Similar structures have been predicted in other arteriviruses and coronaviruses.

References

External links 
 

Cis-regulatory RNA elements
Arteriviridae